The Order of the Red Banner is a military decoration of Mongolia, originally established as the "Order for Military Merit" of the People's Republic of Mongolia. The medal has been awarded to citizens as well as foreigners and institutions for services to the state. Renamed in 1945 as simply the "Order of the Red Banner", the design of the medallion has been changed several times, and in 1961 the ribbon bar of was changed before it was renamed to the "Order of the Red Banner for Military Valor" in 1993.

Recipients

People 

 Yumjaagiin Tsedenbal
Batyn Dorj
 Jamsrangijn Jondon
Lavrentiy Beria
Georgy Zhukov (1939, 1942)
Dmitry Ustinov (1983)
Wojciech Jaruzelski (1983)
Ivan Konev (1945)
Ivan Kozhedub
Ivan Bagramyan
Grigory Shtern (1939)
Viktor Gorbatko
Sergey Shoygu (2018)
Alexander Pokryshkin

Units/Formations 

 Military Logistics Academy (1978)
 032 Military Unit
 014 Construction Unit
112th "Revolutionary Mongolia" Tank Brigade
Army Newspaper "Ulaan Od" ("Red Star")
Mongolian Arat squadron
17th Army (Soviet Union)
S. M. Kirov Military Medical Academy (1978)

Gallery

References

Notes 
 Herfurth D. Sowjetische Auszeichnungen 1918–1991. Auszeichnungen der Mongolische Volksrepublik. 1924–1992. Ein Katalog. Germany. 1999.
 Викторов-Орлов И. В. Награды Монгольской Народной Республики. Определитель. — Горький: РИО Горьковского областного клуба экслибрисистов, 1990.
 Шейн Р., Содномдаржа Ц. Государственные награды Монгольской Народной Республики. 1921—1983 гг. Справочник. — Улан-Батор: Госиздат МНР, 1984.

Citations 

Orders, decorations, and medals of Mongolia
Courage awards
Awards established in 1926